Uvinza is an administrative ward and town in Uvinza District of Kigoma Region in Tanzania. The town is the district capital of Uvinza District. The town is home to salt mining industry in Kigoma region. Uvinza town is situated between where the Ruchugi River and Malagarasi Rivers merge. In 2016 the Tanzania National Bureau of Statistics report there were 24,122 people in the ward, from 35,231 in 2012. Prior to 2014 the Basanza was a village in the Uvinza Ward before splitting off to form its own ward.

Villages / hamlets 
The ward has 3 villages and 21 hamlets.

 Chakulu
 Chakulu
 Ilunde
 Kagembe
 Kitali
 Rukaki
 Mwamila
 Kazaroho
 Mibangani
 Mtakuja
 Songambele
 Uvinza
 Gungu
 Jumuiya
 Kansibu
 Kashari
 Kasulu Road
 Kazaroho
 Logongoni
 Majengo
 Msimba
 Nyanza
 Ruchugi
 Uvinza Kati

References

Wards of Kigoma Region